Cadlinella is a genus of colourful sea slugs, specifically dorid nudibranchs, shell-less marine gastropod mollusks in the family Chromodorididae.

Species 
This genus includes the following species:
 Cadlinella hirsuta Rudman, 1995 
 Cadlinella ornatissima Risbec, 1928 
 Cadlinella subornatissima Baba, 1996

Species brought into synonymy  
 Cadlinella japonica (Baba, 1937) : synonym of Cadlina japonica Baba, 1937
 Cadlinella sagamiensis (Baba, 1937) : synonym of Showajidaia sagamiensis (Baba, 1937)

References

Chromodorididae